Shafiq-ur-Rahman (9 November 1920 – 19 March 2000) was a Pakistani humorist and a short-story writer of Urdu language.

He was one of the most illustrious writers of the Urdu speaking world. Like Mark Twain and Stephen Leacock, he has given enduring pleasure to his readers. He was a medical doctor by profession, and served in Pakistan Army. He also received Hilal-e-Imtiaz for his military and civilian services. He has widely been appreciated by the writers and critics of Urdu literature.

Early life
Rahman was born in a Muslim family in Kalanaur, a small town near Rohtak, British India. He received his education in Bahawalpur. He completed his MBBS from King Edward Medical College, Lahore in 1942, and post-graduation in tropical medicine and public health from Edinburgh, in 1952. Rahman began writing humorous stories during his school days. His stories were published in a literary monthly magazine Khayyam. His first book Kirneyn was completed before he joined the medical college and was published in 1938, while he was still a medical student. His unforgettable characters include Razia, Shaitaan, Hukoomat Aapa, Maqsood Ghora, Buddy, Judge Sahab, Nannha and many other girls including Sarwat, Kishwer, Sa'da, Azra Aapa, Nasreen, Akhtar, Ainak etc.

Career
Rahman joined the Indian Army Medical Corps and served at different war fronts during the Second World War.  After the independence of Pakistan in 1947, he joined the Pakistan Army and eventually rose to the rank of general. He also served as chairman of the Academy of Letters of Pakistan from 1980 to 1985. During his tenure, the Academy of Letters acquired a new dimension as a prominent literary institution of Pakistan. He continued to write till his death in March 2000. Rahman's work added a new dimension to humour in Urdu literature. He created a world that was very real with all its joys, pains and anguish. It was an affirmation of life and of human values: empathy, compassion and respect. Even the seemingly frivolous and trivial situations had hidden meanings that probed deep into the human psyche. His language was simple, spontaneous and expressive.

Awards and recognition
He was awarded the Hilal-e-Imtiaz (Crescent of Excellence) Award by the President of Pakistan for his military and civilian services after his death on 23 March 2001.

Views
Rahman has highly been praised by Urdu writers, like:

An excerpt
Owais Mughal talks of Shafiq-ur-Rahman, the humorist. He recalls:

Here is my attempt at an approximate translation for our English readers:

Death
Rahman had three sons, Attique, Khalique and Ameen. He died on 19 March 2000 in Rawalpindi, Pakistan.

Bibliography
 Kirnein (Rays of Light) 1942
 Shagofey 1943
 Lehrein (Waves) 1944
 Madd-o-jazar (Ebb and Flow) 1946
 Parwaaz (Flight) 1945
 Himaqatain 1947
 Mazeed Himaqatain 1948
  Dajla (a travelogue) 1980
 Insaani Tamasha (a translation of "a human comedy")
 Dareechay 1989
 Pachtaway (Regrets) 1948
 Turup Chaal (Regrets) 1948
 Jaini
 Muskurahatein(smiles)

References

External links
Shafiq-ur-Rehman: A Legendary Writer on Pakistan Link (United States newspaper)
History Of Urdu Language

1920 births
2000 deaths
People from Rohtak district
Pakistani humorists
Pakistani military doctors
Pakistani essayists
Pakistan Army officers
20th-century essayists
Recipients of Hilal-i-Imtiaz
Urdu-language travel writers
Pakistani travel writers